José Matías "Pepe" Navarro González (born 16 June 1950) is a Spanish football manager.

Managerial career
Born in Almería, Andalusia, Navarro was the first manager of newly formed Almería CF, managing the club in four occasions and in three different divisions (regional leagues, Segunda División and Segunda División B, respectively). He also had several spells in the club's staff.

Navarro subsequently resumed his career in the lower leagues, managing Los Molinos CF (two stints), CD Ciudad de Vícar and CD San Isidro.

References

External links

1950 births
Living people
Sportspeople from Almería
Spanish football managers
Segunda División managers
UD Almería managers